When a Woman Sins is a 1918 American silent drama film directed by J. Gordon Edwards and starring Theda Bara.

Plot
As described in a film magazine, nurse Lilian Marchard (Bara) is engaged by Mortimer West (Swickard), an old rogue who is dangerously ill. She meets his son Michael (Roscoe), a divinity student, and his earnestness ignites a spark of love within her. Michael professes his ardent love for her in the garden, and that night, coming upon her in Mortimer's bedroom, she misconstrues the situation and becomes angry. The old man dies and Dr. Stone orders her from the house. The years pass and Lilian becomes Poppea, a notorious charmer and dancer of the town. Among her many lovers is Reggie West, Michael's cousin. Michael goes to Poppea to ask her to give Reggie up for his mother's sake, and Reggie, waiting without, shoots himself. Poppea hosts a dinner for several wealthy men and just as she is about to auction herself off to the highest bidder, she receives a bible and lily from Michael. She gives up her fast friends and returns to the slums to minister to the sick, finally winning Michael's love.

Cast
 Theda Bara as Lilian Marchard / Poppea
 Josef Swickard as Mortimer West
 Albert Roscoe as Michael West 
 Alfred Fremont as Augustus Van Brooks 
 Jack Rollens as Reggie West
 Genevieve Blinn as Mrs. West
 Ogden Crane as Dr. Stone

Reception
Like many American films of the time, When a Woman Sins was subject to cuts by city and state film censorship boards. For example, the Chicago Board of Censors required cuts, in Reel 1, of pictures of a young woman in pajamas, Reel 2, old man kissing nurse on shoulder, Reel 5, the intertitle "I am for sale to the highest bidder", and to insert a new intertitle to the effect that the woman will marry the man who bids the most.

Preservation status
When a Woman Sins is now considered to be a lost film.

See also

List of lost films
1937 Fox vault fire

References

External links

1918 films
1918 drama films
Fox Film films
Silent American drama films
American silent feature films
American black-and-white films
Films directed by J. Gordon Edwards
Lost American films
1918 lost films
Lost drama films
1910s American films